Shile is a rural locality (a selo) in Kuzhniksky Selsoviet, Tabasaransky District, Republic of Dagestan, Russia. The population was 207 as of 2010. There are 3 streets.

Geography 
Shile is located 15 km west of Khuchni (the district's administrative centre) by road. Kharag is the nearest rural locality.

References 

Rural localities in Tabasaransky District